A centrode, in kinematics, is the path traced by the instantaneous center of rotation of a rigid plane figure moving in a plane. There are two types of centrodes: a space or fixed centrode, and a body or moving centrode.

The moving centrode rolls without slip on the fixed centrode.

Gallery

See also
Four-bar_linkage

References
Homer D. Eckhardt  Kinematic Design of Machines and Mechanisms, McGraw-Hill (1998) p. 63 .
Theory of Machine 
[M.Irfan (NFC IET Multan) Contact# (03421713488)]

Kinematics